The Hall of Bhaisajyaguru is the hall to enshrine Bhaisajyaguru, who is also named "Yaoshifo" for short in Chinese Buddhism. 

He is said to be the hierarch of the Eastern vaiḍūryanirbhāsā. Sitting in the center of the lotus pedestal, the statue of Bhaisajyaguru are usually with kind and solemn deportment, blue body and dark hair. With big ears to his shoulders, he wears the clothes of the Buddha and exposes breast and right arm. On the left of Bhaisajyaguru is Suryaprabha with a sun wheel in his hand, representing light; on the right is Candraprabha, with a moon wheel in his hand, representing coolness. They are called "Bhaisajyaguru Three Honored Gods" or "Eastern Three Saints". Many Chinese people believe that enshrining Bhaisajyaguru can cure all diseases, relieve a variety of illness and pain, ward off unluckiness and extend longevity, so since ancient times, people from all walks life worship the Bhaisajyaguru.

References

Bibliography

Further reading
 
 

Chinese Buddhist architecture